A borlengo (plural: borlenghi), also called a burlengo or zampanelle, is a thin flatbread now made with water, eggs (sometimes omitted) flour and salt. Originally a food eaten by the poor and made with flour and water, it is now often made outside in a frying pan the size of a cartwheel. These are then rubbed with a mixture that can contain rosemary, garlic, salt pork, olive oil, or what is called cunza, sauteed minced pancetta and sausage, folded into quarters and sprinkled with Parmigiano.

See also

 List of pancakes

References

Emilia (region of Italy)
Cuisine of Emilia-Romagna
Pancakes